The 2015 African Women's Youth Handball Championship was the 4th edition of the tournament, organized by the African Handball Confederation, under the auspices of the International Handball Federation and held in Nairobi, Kenya from July 2 to 9, 2015.

Egypt won their first title. The top three teams qualified for the 2016 world championship.

Participating teams

All matches
aLL teams played in a double round robin system.

All times are local (UTC+3).

Round 1

Round 2

Round 3

Round 4

Round 5

Round 6

Final standings

Awards

See also
 2014 African Women's Handball Championship
 2014 African Men's Junior Handball Championship

References

External links

2015 in African handball
2015 African Women's Youth Handball Championship
International handball competitions hosted by Kenya
Youth
July 2015 events in Africa